Agonopterix nodiflorella is a moth of the family Depressariidae. It is found in most of southern Europe.

The larvae feed on Ferula communis. They initially mine the leaves of their host plant. They fully mine out a number of leaf fragments. Older larvae live freely between spun leaf segments. Larvae can be found from March to April. Young larvae are green with a black head.

References

Moths described in 1866
Agonopterix
Moths of Europe